The Old U.S. Customshouse and Post Office at 300 West Liberty Street in Louisville, Kentucky was built in 1853.  It served historically as a federal district court, custom house, and post office. It was listed on the National Register of Historic Places in 1977.

Warehouse
The Fireproof Storage Company Warehouse is a 1907 Beaux Arts style warehouse designed by Arthur Loomis. It is also known as the Chamber of Commerce Building and as the 310 Building.

The National Register listing was expanded in 1980 to include the warehouse.  The combined listing, Old U.S. Customshouse and Post Office and Fireproof Storage Company Warehouse, covers 300-314 West Liberty Street.

See also 
List of United States post offices

References 

Beaux-Arts architecture in Kentucky
Commercial buildings in Louisville, Kentucky
Government buildings completed in 1853
Government buildings completed in 1907
Courthouses in Kentucky
Government buildings on the National Register of Historic Places in Kentucky
Post office buildings on the National Register of Historic Places in Kentucky
Warehouses on the National Register of Historic Places
19th-century buildings and structures in Louisville, Kentucky
National Register of Historic Places in Louisville, Kentucky
Custom houses on the National Register of Historic Places
1853 establishments in Kentucky
1907 establishments in Kentucky